The Ivchenko AI-25 is a family of military and civilian twin-shaft medium bypass turbofan engines developed by Ivchenko OKB of the Soviet Union. It was the first bypass engine ever used on short haul aircraft in the USSR. 
The engine is still produced by Ukrainian based aircraft engine manufacturing company, Motor Sich.

Development
The AI-25 was designed to power the Yakovlev Yak-40 tri-jet airliner, often called the first regional jet transport aircraft, and is the starting point for the Lotarev DV-2 turbofan engine. The project was launched in 1965, with  the AI-25s first test flight in 1966, and finally cleared for production in 1967. In 1972, the AI-25 was selected for the Polish PZL M-15 Belphegor, the world's only jet-powered biplane.

Development of the AI-25 continued and the uprated AI-25TL was designed for use by the Czechoslovak Aero L-39 Albatros military trainer with the first flight occurring in 1968. The L-39, would go on to become one of the most popular, and widespread trainer aircraft in the world, with over 3,000 L-39s produced, and with 2,900 examples still in active service today. A smaller version of the AI-25TL, the AI-25TLK has equipped the People's Republic of Chinas  Hongdu L-11 fighter-trainer.

The AI-25TLK is also licensed built in the People's Republic of China as the WS-11. Another variant of the AI-25, is the AI-25TLSh in the 1990s, which underwent flight testing by the Ukrainian Ministry of Defense in 2002. Ivchenko-Progress is currently marketing the AI-25TLSh as an upgrade to existing L-39 and JL-8 operators that would extend the service life of the aircraft and improve performance. The latest AI-25 is the AI-25TL Series 2 designed for the Mikoyan MiG-AT.

For the demand of a stronger turbofan engine by Turkey for its jet-powered Bayraktar MIUS UAV the Ukrainian company developed the stronger AI-25TLT variant

Variants

AI-25
AI-25A
AI-25TL
AI-25TL series 2

AI-25TLT (Black Sea Shield - turbofan) The AI-25TLT licence-built by Turkish-Ukrainian joint venture BSS based in Istanbul for the Bayraktar MIUS

AI-25TLK
AI-25TLSh
AI-25W
AI-25WM
WS-11 (WoShan - turbofan) The AI-25TLK licence-built in China for the Hongdu L-11
Walter Titan (AI-25WM)
Walter Sirius

Applications
 Aero L-39 Albatros
 Comp Air Jet
 Hongdu JL-8
 PZL M-15 Belphegor
 Yakovlev Yak-40
 KB SAT SR-10
Bayraktar MIUS

Specifications (AI-25TL)

See also

References

External links

 Ivchenko-Progress company website
 Motor-Sich company website 
 A.Ivchenko Engines
 AI-25 on LeteckeMotory.cz (cs,sk)

Ivchenko-Progress aircraft engines
Medium-bypass turbofan engines
1960s turbofan engines